The Impostor (German: Die Hochstaplerin) is a 1927 German silent drama film directed by Martin Berger and starring Ruth Weyher, Anton Pointner and Philipp Manning. It was shot at the Johannisthal Studios in Berlin. The film's sets were designed by the art director Otto Erdmann and Hans Sohnle.

Cast
 Ruth Weyher as Die Hochstaplerin Baronin Neruda
 Anton Pointner as Ihr Freund, von Torelli 
 Philipp Manning as Geschäftsfreund 
 Theodor Loos as Prof. Gehrsdorf 
 Margarete Lanner as Edith Bernau 
 Ernst Rückert as Gutsbesitzer Wothe 
 Fritz Alberti as Förster 
 Bruno Arno as Zuhöhrer 
 Sophie Pagay as Gehrsdorfs Wirtschaftlerin 
 Paul Graetz as Juwelier 
 Erna Rima as Kellnerin
 Dagmar Murzewa as Frau des Förters

References

Bibliography
 Paul Matthew St. Pierre. Cinematography in the Weimar Republic: Lola Lola, Dirty Singles, and the Men Who Shot Them. Rowman & Littlefield, 2016.

External links

1927 films
Films of the Weimar Republic
German silent feature films
German black-and-white films
Films directed by Martin Berger
Bavaria Film films
Films shot at Johannisthal Studios
1927 drama films
German drama films